Lindeman Lake is a small lake in Chilliwack Lake Provincial Park, British Columbia, Canada.  Located at the end of a 3.4 km trail, it is a popular hiking destination. A variety of fish inhabit this lake, including brook trout, cutthroat trout, rainbow trout, steelhead. Lindeman lake can be found by driving 40.5 km from Vedder Crossing along Chilliwack Lake road. Lindeman lake trail can be found on the left hand side of the road prior to Chilliwack Lake Provincial Park.

External links
ChilliwackLife.com - Information about and photos of Lindeman Lake
Lindeman Lake Hike - Full details for hiking to the lake.

Lakes of British Columbia
Yale Division Yale Land District